Mark Wilson is a Canadian actor and writer. He was born in St. Catharines, Ontario, Canada.

Mark is best known for:
 The Red Green Show (1991)
 The High Life (1996)
 Fly Away Home (1996)
 The Border (2008)
 Dream House (2011)

Alumnus of The Second City comedy troupe.

References

External links
 

Living people
Canadian male comedians
Canadian male television actors
Male actors from Ontario
Comedians from Ontario
People from St. Catharines
20th-century Canadian male actors
21st-century Canadian male actors
Year of birth missing (living people)